The Normal Theater is a cinema located in the downtown area of Normal, Illinois of the United States of America, which is located in McLean County. The theater closed for a time in the early 1990s but reopened in 1993 after being purchased and renovated by the town of Normal. It has since been in continuous operation, showing a mix of first run and classic films. The building is on the National Register of Historic Places and has been since July 25, 1997.

History
The Normal Theater opened for operation in November 1937. The Streamline Moderne building was a state of the art cinema at the time which was built to "show sound movies in the best comfortable environment." The original commercial operation of the Normal Theater ended in May 1990 after it had been divided into a two screen theater a few years prior. The Town of Normal purchased the theater and reopened it in 1993 through a community restoration effort. Today theater goers enjoy a "throwback" theater going experience in the fully restored art deco theater. The inside restoration installed plush, coral colored seating, blue, maroon and salmon colored walls, high-modern style aisle lights and layered ceiling of multi colored neon lights.

External links
 Normal Theater website

Notes

National Register of Historic Places in McLean County, Illinois
Buildings and structures in Bloomington–Normal
Cinemas and movie theaters in Illinois
Streamline Moderne architecture in Illinois
Tourist attractions in Bloomington–Normal
Theatres on the National Register of Historic Places in Illinois